The A47 is a major road in England linking Birmingham to Lowestoft, Suffolk. Most of the section between Birmingham and Nuneaton is now classified as the B4114. From Peterborough eastwards, it is a trunk road (sections west of the A1 road have been downgraded as alternative roads have been built).

DYK?...

It is the only A road in Zone 4 to enter Norfolk and Suffolk. No roads from Zones 2, 3, 5, 6, 7, 8 or 9 enter the counties, which lie exclusively in Zone 1.
Between the Clickers Way roundabout in Earl Shilton and the B582 junction near Leicester, the A47 runs through a forest.
Between Birmingham and Nuneaton is the B4114 road.
The A47 road is partly a holiday road, through West Midlands, Warwickshire, Leicestershire, Rutland, Cambridgeshire, Norfolk, and Suffolk, since it ends in Lowestoft, a tourist destination with a beach. On the way it passes the city of Norwich and the Norfolk Broads, both popular tourist destinations in their own right. Its other main function is the transport of goods by road to and from the A1 into Norfolk, north Suffolk and the ports at Great Yarmouth and Lowestoft.

History

The original (1923) route of the A47 was Birmingham to Great Yarmouth, but there were some changes made to its route in the early years.
At its eastern end, the A47 originally ran through Filby and Caister-on-Sea, with the Acle Straight bearing the number B1140.

A change took place in 1925. The original route of the A47 between Guyhirn and Wisbech in the Isle of Ely was via Wisbech St Mary, with the direct route being part of the A141. This is because there was no road bridge over the River Nene at Guyhirn, and hence no junction between the A47 and the A141. In April 1925 a steel road bridge was opened, and the A47 and the A141 swapped routes between Guyhirn and Wisbech.

The A47 was rerouted along the Acle Straight in 1935, with the old route being renumbered as the A1064 (Acle to Caister-on-Sea) and part of the A149 (Caister to Great Yarmouth). Another change also dates from 1935. The A47 originally ran via Downham Market, not King's Lynn. In 1935, it was rerouted via King's Lynn, replacing part of the A141 (Wisbech to King's Lynn) and part of the A17 (King's Lynn to Swaffham). The old route via Downham Market was renumbered as the A1122 (Outwell to Swaffham) and part of the A1101 (Wisbech to Outwell).

Major improvements were made from the late 1970s until early in the 1990s. The 7 mile (11.3 km) £5 million part-dual-carriageway East Dereham Bypass built on part of the disused railway line was opened in spring 1978 followed by a five-mile (8 km) part-dual-carriageway Swaffham Bypass, costing £5 million which was opened in June 1981. Bypasses for Uppingham (£1.4 million) and Blofield (£4 million) were opened in 1982 and 1983 respectively. The southern section of the Great Yarmouth Western Bypass was opened in May 1985 and the northern section in March 1986 at a cost of £19 million followed by improvements to the one mile (1.6 km) Postwick-Blofield section (£1.2 million) which was opened in November 1987. In 1989 Acle Bypass was completed as a cost of £7.1 million and the £1.2 million East Norton Bypass was opened in December 1990. The three mile (4.8 km) £9 million East Dereham-North Tuddenham Improvement opened in August 1992 and the £62 million Norwich southern Bypass in September 1992.

Escalating road protests starting with Twyford Down in 1992 and culminating with the Newbury bypass in 1996 (at which over 1,000 people were arrested) led to over 300 road schemes being cancelled in November 1995 and to the cancellation of further schemes including the Thorney bypass by the new Labour government in 1997.

In 2002 the government announced a new road building programme which included the three mile (4.8 km) dual-carriageway Thorney bypass which opened on 14 December 2005.

In February 2017 the Highways Agency re-designated the stretch of the A12 road between Great Yarmouth and Lowestoft as the A47.

Proposed improvements

Acle Straight (New Road)

A study on the A47 which concluded in 2001 looked at improving New Road, i.e. the section of the A47 between Acle and Great Yarmouth known as the Acle Straight. The improvement of the Acle Straight has become a point of contention between interested parties due to its passage through the Norfolk Broads, an area of important ecological and conservation significance that limits development. The study which recommended widening rather than dualling of the Acle Straight was opposed by the Broadland District Council, Great Yarmouth Borough Council, Norfolk Police Authority and the majority of local respondents who believed that dualling of the road is necessary to improve road safety, decrease journey time and support the economic development of Great Yarmouth. Dualling was however strongly opposed by the Environment Agency, the Council for National Parks (CNP) and the Broads Authority due to its impact on biodiversity and internationally important wildlife sites. These parties did cautiously support further investigation into the option for widening following further investigation of its environmental impact.

Acle Straight safety improvement scheme
In 2006 a programme of safety improvement for the Acle Straight were announced. This would include road resurfacing, better road markings, improved visibility and the installation of safety cameras at an estimated total cost of £1.6 million. The result would then be monitored while long-term improvements, such as widening, are considered. In October 2009 after it was announced that a £40,000 feasibility study, to see whether roadside ditches along the nine-mile stretch could be moved further back without disturbing delicate marshland habitat had been delayed until autumn 2010 at the earliest.

Norwich Northern Distributor Road

A£117 million road scheme to the north of Norwich, linking the A1067 and Norwich International Airport to the A47, sponsored and managed by Norfolk County Council. It was priority scheme for Norfolk County Council and it attracted strong opposition both locally and from environmental groups. On 2 June 2015 the scheme was given the go ahead, in 2017 parts of the road were opened with the complete road opened in early 2018.

Norwich Western Link
In 2007 Norfolk County Council started developing a proposal for a link road between the A47 and A1067 in the area between Hockering and Lenwade. Five different route options were considered which ranged from 1.5 km to 3.4 km of new road construction and an estimated construction cost of between £5.8 million – £9.1 million. Public consultation on the proposal was held between July and September 2007 with the most support given to Option 1 with positive responses from residents, businesses and Parish and District Councils. Although costing more than £5 million the scheme did not meet any of the targets of the Local Transport Plan and so did not qualify for regional funding. Funding for the scheme would therefore have to be found by the County Council.
 The scheme was not progressed.

In April 2017 however Norfolk County Council voted to make the Norwich Western Link one of its three top highway priorities. The scheme would connect the A47 at Easton with the A1067 at Attlebridge at the end of the Norwich Northern Distributor Road and consultants have been brought in to progress the scheme.

Other proposed improvements
In 2012 Norfolk County Council launched the strategic route prospectus which detailed improvement schemes along the A47 between Peterborough and King's Lynn. The list of improvements, costing a total £526 million, included dualling sections of the road and other junction improvements. The sections of the road to be dualled were the Acle straight, Blofield to Burlingham, North Tuddenham to Easton and the East Winch/Middleton bypass. Other improvements detailed were four schemes at Great Yarmouth, including a £112 million third river crossing, four junction improvements along the Norwich Southern Bypass and improvements to the three junctions at King's Lynn.

On 8 October 2012 it was the announced that improvements to the A1/A47 junction at Wansford and the roundabout at Honingham would be approved for pinch point funding. On 1 December 2014 it was announced that a package of improvements to the A47 worth a total of £300 million would be funded during the 2015-20 parliament. Shadow chancellor Ed Balls said that the proposed improvements would be honoured by any incoming Labour government. The proposed improvements consisted of 
 dualling the section between Blofield and North Burlingham
 dualling the section between Easton and Tuddenham
 dualling the section between Wansford and Sutton
 improvements to the A47/A141 junction at Guyhirn
 improvements to the A47/A11 Thickthorn junction
 safety improvements to the Acle Straight
 improvements to the A47/A149 junction at Great Yarmouth

Route

Birmingham
The Birmingham end of the A47 starts one mile from the centre of Birmingham at the Ashsted Circus roundabout on the A4540 Middleway running north-east through Vauxhall as Nechells Parkway and then Saltley Road. (Historically it started in the City Centre on High Street.) The road continues north east following the Cross Country Route and River Rea as first Heartlands Parkway and then Fort Parkway. The Birmingham section of the road terminates at Spitfire Island, a roundabout on the A452 halfway between the M6 Junction 5 and A38 Tyburn Island.

The route between Birmingham and Nuneaton was known as the A47 until 1986, when it was renumbered, mainly as the B4114, following the completion of the M42.

Nuneaton – Leicester

At Nuneaton the road re-emerges as Hinckley Road from a junction with the A444, near the railway station. Leaving Nuneaton, it passes North Warwickshire and Hinckley College on the left, it meets the A4254 at a roundabout and the A5 Watling Street near the Longshoot Hotel. It follows the A5 for a half-mile entering Leicestershire and the district of Hinckley and Bosworth, then leaves at a roundabout to bypass Hinckley to the north as Dodwells Road then Normandy Way which was completed in the summer of 1994. This section passes through a large industrial estate and close to a Tesco distribution centre, crossing the Ashby-de-la-Zouch Canal. It meets a roundabout near the Triumph motorbike factory. It bypasses Earl Shilton on its southern side as a single carriageway road. It then runs through Leicester Forest on a line parallel with the M69. It enters Leicester Forest East crossing the M1 near the service station and continues on into the City of Leicester at the B5380 junction. The road continues into the city centre crossing the A563 outer ring-road before becoming part of the inner ring road.

Leicester – A1

Leaving Leicester the road becomes Humberstone Road, then Uppingham Road. It passes under the Midland Main Line and meets the B6146 St Barnabas Road to the south, then passes over the former Leicester Belgrave Road to Peterborough North section of the Great Northern Railway which follows the road as far as Houghton on the Hill. At the A6030 crossroads, it becomes part of the Leicester outer ring road in North Evington. At Humberstone, beyond the A563 (outer ring road) and Goodwood Road (projected extension of the outer ring road) crossroads, the road meets the B667 Spencefield Lane to the south, for Evington. Between the Downing Drive junction and Thurnby Hill it enters Leicestershire and the district of Harborough. At Thurnby it meets Station Road to the north, for Scraptoft. Leaving Bushby it climbs Winkadale Hill into the countryside.

The road travels through Houghton on the Hill, with crossroads for Leicester Airport (to the south) and Old Ingarsby (to the north) next to the Rose and Crown and JET Houghton Garage, and heads down Palace Hill with a right turn for Gaulby, a left turn for Tilton on the Hill, then crosses the River Sence. The two-mile £2.5 million three-lane Billesdon Bypass opened in October 1986, passing north of the village, with staggered crossroads. It meets the B6047 north-south Market Harborough to Melton Mowbray road (for Tilton on the Hill) at staggered crossroads at the highest point of the A47, at around 670 feet. It passes through Skeffington with a right turn for Rolleston then heads through Tugby, which is traversed by the Midshires Way and National Cycle Route 63. It winds its way towards the one-kilometre £1.2 million East Norton Bypass, which opened in December 1990, passing south of the village, with a left turn for Loddington and right turn for Hallaton. Leaving the village, after rejoining the former route, it passes the former railway station. It heads down a hill as three lanes and crosses the Eye Brook and from here the next ten miles are in Rutland, and three lanes become two.

There is a left turn for Belton-in-Rutland and a right turn for Allexton (in Leicestershire) where the road is crossed by the Leicestershire Round and Macmillan Way. The two-mile £1.9 million Wardley Hill Improvement opened in October 1987, and there is a right turn (only) for Wardley, where the road is crossed by the Rutland Round. The road improvement took a less-crooked route closer to the village, with a less steep incline avoiding the top of Wardley Hill. The one-and-a-half-mile £1.4 million Uppingham Bypass opened in June 1982, taking a shorter route north of the town, which is the home of Uppingham School. It meets the A6003 (for Oakham) at a roundabout, and meets the former Glaston Road route and crossroads for Bisbrooke, to the south. It passes through Glaston, with crossroads for Wing (to the north) and Seaton (to the south) near the Old Pheasant. It passes over the tunnel of the Oakham to Kettering Line. Entering Morcott it passes Redwings Lodge, a former Travelodge, and a new cafe restaurant, the Country Lounge originally a Little Chef, on the left and there is a left turn for Morcott, where the road is crossed by the Rutland Round. It meets the A6121 (for Stamford) and B672 (for Caldecott) where it crosses a tunnel of a former railway. At a right turn for Barrowden there is Morcott Windmill, and the road is again crossed by the Rutland Round. There is a crossroads for South Luffenham and Barrowden.

From Shire Oaks (Coppice Leys) through Tixover, the road has been straightened, and to the right is the Welland Valley (Rutland – Northamptonshire boundary). At Tixover there is a crossroads, where the Rutland Round follows the road to the east. The road crosses the River Welland, where the Jurassic Way crosses the road. The Duddington Bypass, where the road enters Northamptonshire and the district of North Northamptonshire, opened in 1975. This section has a busy roundabout where it meets the south-west/north-east corridor A43. On the northern edge of Collyweston Great Wood, it meets Kingscliffe Road for Collyweston, at the west gate of RAF Wittering. It follows the perimeter fence of the airfield to Collyweston Cross Roads (now no longer crossroads due to the airfield), where there is a right turn for Kings Cliffe. The woodland here is the northern edge of the historic Rockingham Forest. The road towards Wittering Lodge has been straightened, and crosses the City of Peterborough boundary (former Northamptonshire, then Cambridgeshire). At Toll Bar Cottage, there is a left turn for Wittering, opposite Bedford Purlieus National Nature Reserve. The road meets the A1.

A1 – Kings Lynn
The road formerly went through Wansford, further to the south. The £250,000 dual-carriageway Wansford North Bypass opened in January 1965. There is a right-turn for Sutton. It is crossed by the Roman road Ermine Street. The dual-carriageway £9 million Ailsworth-Castor Bypass opened in September 1991. Around Peterborough, the Peterborough Longthorpe Grade separated junction (GSJ) opened in December 1987 where it meets the A1260. There is a GSJ for Bretton and a Sainsbury's, and it passes the Peterborough City Hospital. The £1.2 million Peterborough Westwood GSJ opened in January 1987 near Ravensthorpe. This section of road is called the Soke Parkway (named after the Soke of Peterborough). When this was first built, in the mid-1970s, the A47 followed what is now the A15 Paston Parkway.

It crosses the East Coast Main Line and meets the A15 at New England near to a Morrisons (former Safeway), and Boulevard and Brotherhood retail parks at Walton to the north and New England to the south. There is another GSJ near Paston to the north and it meets the other strand of the A15 at a GSJ near Gunthorpe. It meets the southern terminus of the new A16 alignment before meeting the A1139 at a roundabout and crossing the Car Dyke. The  £7.2 million Eye Bypass opened as Eye Road in October 1991, diverting traffic from the Paston Parkway, and partly built on the former Peterborough to Wisbech railway. There is a local access roundabout at Eye Green near the Esso Eye Green Service Station, a Travelodge and the Peterborough Eye former Little Chef on the right, where it becomes Thorney Road, The Causeway. The landscape becomes very flat known as The Fens. A  dual-carriageway bypass of Thorney opened on 14 December 2005. The road meets the B1040 and B1167 at roundabouts. Near Thorney Toll, the road enters Cambridgeshire and the district of Fenland near the New Toll Service Station. The straight road finishes at Guyhirn, meeting the B1187 and crossing on the Tiddy Mun bridge and following the River Nene and the Nene Way. The  £3.7 million Guyhirn Diversion opened in October 1990. The road heads north-east, following the east bank of the River Nene. The  £6 million Wisbech/West Walton Bypass opened in autumn 1984. The former route leaves as the B198 at a roundabout. It meets a level crossing, and it enters Norfolk and the district of King's Lynn and West Norfolk just before a roundabout with the A1101 for Elm and Emneth at the Elme Hall Hotel. It passes the Total Wisbech Services and then meets the old route (B198) at a roundabout and becomes the  £23 million dual-carriageway Walpole Highway/Tilney High End Bypass which opened in summer 1996. There is an exit for Walpole Highway, and another for Terrington St John. It passes near Tilney High End. Near Tilney All Saints, it meets the old route at a roundabout, becoming the single carriageway Main Road, then Pullover Road. It meets the end of the A17 at the "Pullover Roundabout" where the West Lynn Little Chef is located.

King's Lynn – Great Yarmouth

From King's Lynn, the road goes over the River Great Ouse and Fen Rivers Way, near to former sugar beet factory site on a very busy concrete dual-carriageway built in 1975. It meets the A148 at a GSJ. The A10 and the A149 have their terminus here, at the Hardwick Flyover (opened on 30 October 2003) near the large Hardwick Industrial Estate (formerly home of Campbell's Soup) and a Ramada Hotel. It becomes Constitution Hill, passing North Runcton then Middleton, where it passes the Crown public house and St Mary's church as "Lynn Road".

Next is East Winch, where it passes All Saints's church, then West Bilney where it passes St Cecilia's church. The former King's Lynn-Swaffham railway crossed at this point. There is a right-turn for Pentney and it meets the B1153 for East Walton. The half-mile £2.8 million Narborough Bypass, opened in November 1992, where the road crosses the River Nar and enters the district of Breckland. There is a straight section to where it meets the A1122 (for RAF Marham) at a roundabout at the start of the five-mile £5 million part-dual-carriageway Swaffham Bypass, which opened in June 1981. There is an exit for Swaffham, and a GSJ with the A1065 (for Fakenham).

It passes some wind turbines and there is a roundabout where it joins the former route just before it is crossed by the Peddars Way. There is a left turn for Sporle and it passes Necton then heads north-west through Little Fransham, passing the Canary and Linnet, with a left turn for Crane's Corner. The seven-mile £5 million part-dual-carriageway East Dereham Bypass opened in spring 1978, which was built on part of the disused railway line. It passes near Wendling and St Peter and St Paul church then meets the B1146 (for Dereham) and A1075 (for Shipdham) near a Tesco supermarket and B1135. The B1147 leaves for Swanton Morley. The three-mile £9 million East Dereham-North Tuddenham Improvement opened in August 1992, which passes North Tuddenham. It bypasses Hockering. It enters the district of Broadland at the start of the bypass of Honingham, where it crosses the River Tud. Just before the roundabout at Easton, it enters the district of South Norfolk. The dual-carriageway £62 million Norwich Bypass opened in September 1992. At the Longwater Intersection, the A1074 follows the former route through Norwich near the Longwater Retail Park and Sainsbury's. Near Bawburgh, it crosses the River Yare. There is a GSJ with the B1108, for Little Melton and Colney. At Cringleford, it meets the A11 at the Thickthorn Interchange and Thickthorn Services and crosses the Breckland Line. Near Keswick Hall, it meets the A140 at a GSJ at Harford Bridge, south of Norwich, near a Tesco, then crosses the Great Eastern Main Line. It is crossed by Boudica's Way, then meets the A146 at a GSJ. It crosses the River Yare again at the Postwick Viaduct and enters the district of Broadland. It crosses the Wherry Line and meets the A1042 at a GSJ. The section from the end of this bypass to Blofield, the one-mile £1.2 million Postwick-Blofield Dualling, was opened in November 1987. There is a left turn to Great Plumstead. The one-mile £4 million dual-carriageway Blofield Bypass opened in February 1983, which starts at a roundabout for Brundall. It becomes single carriageway and passes North Burlingham near the staggered White House crossroads with the B1140. The three-mile £7.1 million dual-carriageway Acle Bypass opened in March 1989, which ends at a roundabout with the A1048 near a Travelodge , becoming the single carriageway New Road. From Acle, the road enters the Acle Straight which is nearly seven miles of straight and level single carriageway to Great Yarmouth, with just one curve at Road House Diner. The road is notorious for congestion, especially during the holiday season, and also for the number of accidents, which due to the drainage ditches on either side of the road are often fatal, and demands for dualling have been heard for many years, although there are no current plans to go ahead with this. It enters the district of Great Yarmouth, then passes close to Breydon Water. The northern section of the two-mile £19 million Great Yarmouth Western Bypass (A47) opened in March 1986, and the southern section opened in May 1995.

Route Extension: Great Yarmouth-Lowestoft

In February 2017, Highways England announced that the A47 would be extended by around 10 miles by renumbering the section of the A12, which runs from Great Yarmouth's Western Bypass/Vauxhall Roundabout which intersects with the A47/A12 and A1064 at the moment, continuing through the Gorleston Relief Bypass, passing the James Paget University Hospital and then continuing through to Lowestoft where it then intersects with the A12 where the road will terminate and the A12 starts to continue on to London.

As of 11 February 2017, around half of the A12 has been renumbered in Lowestoft up to Hopton-on-Sea where visible signage of the A12 had been recovered with the A47, but the section between Hopton-on-Sea and Great Yarmouth has only had yellow signs notifying of the renumbering change but the A12 signage has not been removed.

Improvement works are expected to be made in Great Yarmouth on especially the Western Bypass section spanning over the Breydon Bridge, where safety improvements are expected to be made to the Vauxhall Roundabout, Gapton Hall Roundabout, James Paget University Hospital and also the Acle Straight (Acle New Road).

Transit service 
 Between Leicester and Uppingham, the A47 is serviced by bus route 747 Uppingham–Leicester.

References

External links

 SABRE First 99 – A47

Roads in England
Transport in Birmingham, West Midlands
Roads in Cambridgeshire
Transport in Leicestershire
Transport in Leicester
Transport in Norfolk
Transport in Rutland
Roads in the West Midlands (county)
Roads in Warwickshire